The men's vault competition was one of eight events for male competitors in artistic gymnastics at the 1956 Summer Olympics in Melbourne. It was held from 3 to 7 December at the Melbourne Festival Hall. There were 63 competitors from 18 nations (down sharply from the 185 gymnasts in 1952), with nations in the team competition having up to 6 gymnasts and other nations entering up to 3 gymnasts. The event was won by Helmut Bantz of the United Team of Germany and Valentin Muratov of the Soviet Union, who tied for the top place. Soviet Yuri Titov finished third to win the bronze medal.

Background

This was the ninth appearance of the event, which is one of the five apparatus events held every time there were apparatus events at the Summer Olympics (no apparatus events were held in 1900, 1908, 1912, or 1920). Seven of the top 12 (including ties for 9th) gymnasts from 1952 returned: gold medalist Viktor Chukarin of the Soviet Union, silver medalist Masao Takemoto and bronze medalist Takashi Ono of Japan, and fifth-place finisher Theo Wied of Germany (now the United Team of Germany). The reigning (1954) world champion, Leo Sotorník of Czechoslovakia, did not compete in Melbourne, but the runner-up (Helmut Bantz of the United Team of Germany) did.

Australia and Canada each made their debut in the men's vault; East and West Germany competed together as the United Team of Germany for the first time. The United States made its eighth appearance, most of any nation, having missed only the inaugural 1896 Games.

Competition format

The gymnastics format continued to use the aggregation format, mostly following the scoring tweaks made in 1952. Each nation entered either a team of six gymnasts or up to three individual gymnasts. The event used a "vaulting horse" aligned parallel to the gymnast's run (rather than the modern "vaulting table" in use since 2004). All entrants in the gymnastics competitions performed both a compulsory exercise and a voluntary exercise for each apparatus. The 2 exercise scores were summed to give an apparatus total. No separate finals were contested.

Exercise scores ranged from 0 to 10 and apparatus scores from 0 to 20.

Schedule

All times are Australian Eastern Standard Time (UTC+10)

Results

References

Official Olympic Report
www.gymnasticsresults.com
www.gymn-forum.net

Men's vault
Men's 1956
Men's events at the 1956 Summer Olympics